This is a list of notable alumni of the University of Miami School of Law, the law school of the University of Miami, located in Coral Gables, Florida.

Judiciary

Federal courts
 Tamara W. Ashford (LL.M.), United States Tax Court judge
 Ted Cabot (LL.B. 1953), United States District Court Judge 
 A. Jay Cristol (J.D. 1959), U.S. Bankruptcy Court for the Southern District of Florida Chief Judge Emeritus 
 Alan Stephen Gold (LL.M. 1974), United States District Court Judge 
 John A. Houston (J.D. 1977), United States District Court Judge
 Adalberto Jordan (J.D. 1987), United States Federal Appeals Judge 
 Jose E. Martinez (J.D. 1965), United States District Court Judge 
 Federico A. Moreno (J.D. 1978), Chief United States District Court Judge 
 Lenore Carrero Nesbitt (LL.B. 1957), United States District Court Judge 
 Dustin Pead (J.D. 1998), United States Magistrate Judge 
 Robin S. Rosenbaum (J.D. 1991), United States Circuit Court Judge for the Eleventh Circuit Court of Appeals 
 Kenneth Ryskamp (J.D. 1956), United States District Court Judge 
 Thomas E. Scott, Jr. (J.D. 1972), United States District Court Judge 
 Kathleen M. Williams (J.D. 1982), United States District Court Judge

State courts
 Joseph A. Boyd Jr. (LL.B. 1948), Florida Supreme Court Justice from 1969-1987, Chief Justice from 1984-1986
 Gerald Kogan (LL.B. 1955), Florida Supreme Court Justice from 1987-1998, Chief Justice from 1986-1988 
 R. Fred Lewis (J.D. 1972), Chief Justice, Florida Supreme Court (1998–Present)
 Ed Newman (J.D. 1987), National Football League All-Pro football player, and County Court Judge in Miami, Florida
 Ian Richards (J.D. 2002), County Court Judge of Florida's 17th Judicial Circuit

Non-United States courts
 Doris König (M.C.L. 1982), vice president, Federal Constitutional Court of Germany

Government and politics

Federal officials
 Sue McCourt Cobb (J.D. 1972), former U.S. Ambassador to Jamaica and former Florida Secretary of State 
 Charles D. Michel (J.D. 1992), 30th Vice Commandant of the United States Coast Guard, first career judge advocate in any of the Armed Forces to achieve four-star rank.
 Reince Priebus (J.D. 1998), 27th White House Chief of Staff, former Chairman of the Republican National Committee
 Gregg Wenzel (J.D. 1994), former Central Intelligence Agency operative

Members of U.S. Congress
 Pat Cannon (LL.B. 1931), United States Representative (1939-1947) 
 Dante Fascell (LL.B. 1938), United States Representative (1955-1993), Chair of the House Foreign Affairs Committee (1983-1993) 
 Joe Garcia (J.D. 1991), United States Representative (2013–2015) 
 Tom Rooney (J.D. 1998), United States Representative (2009–Present) 
 Marco Rubio (J.D. 1996), United States Senator (2011–Present)

State and local administration
 Manny Diaz (J.D. 1980), former Mayor of the City of Miami 
 Daryl Jones (J.D. 1987), former member, Florida Senate, Florida House of Representatives 
 Alex Penelas (J.D. 1985), former Mayor of Dade County, Florida
 Maria Sachs (J.D. 1978), former member, Florida Senate, Florida House of Representatives

Foreign officials
 Dean Barrow (LL.M. 1981), former prime minister of Belize

Private practice
 Roy Black (J.D. 1967), criminal defense attorney
 Reince Priebus (J.D. 1998), 27th White House Chief of Staff, president and chief strategist for Michael Best and Friedrich LLP
 Robert H. Traurig (J.D. 1950), founder, Greenberg Traurig, LLP
 Nancy Chemtob (J.D. 1990), founder, Chemtob, Moss, Forman & Beyda

Business
 James J. Greco (J.D. 1983), former president and CEO, Sbarro
 Andrew Heiberger (J.D. 1993), founder, owner, and CEO, Buttonwood Development and Town Residential
Jeffrey Martin (J.D. 1992), chairman and CEO of Sempra Energy
Lisa Song Sutton, businesswoman, real estate investor, attorney, former Miss Nevada United States and former congressional candidate

Sports

 Ed Lynch (J.D. 1991), professional baseball player, coach and executive
Ken Pavia, former sports agent, founder of MMAagents Sports Agency, and the former CEO of India's first MMA Super Fight League
Ed Rubinoff (born 1935), tennis player
 Marc Trestman (J.D. 1983), former University of Miami football assistant coach, former head coach of the Chicago Bears of the National Football League

Other
 Henry N. Butler (1982), Dean of George Mason University's Antonin Scalia School of Law
 Xavier Cortada (J.D. 1991), artist 
 Patricia Ireland (J.D. 1975), former president of the National Organization for Women 
 Carolyn Lamm, former president of the American Bar Association 
 Larry R. Leiby (J.D. 1973), commercial arbitrator 
 Ann Levine (J.D. 1999), commentator, author, and consultant
 Paul Levine (J.D. 1973), novelist, author of legal thrillers
 Barbara Parker (J.D.), mystery writer.
 Ana Maria Polo (1987), Hispanic television arbitrator on Caso Cerrado

References

United States law-related lists
Miami-related lists
 
Lists of people by university or college in Florida